Adjudicative competence, also referred to as competence to stand trial, is a legal construct describing the criminal defendant's ability to understand and participate in legal proceedings. This includes the defendant's current ability to participate in various pleas and waivers of rights. It is unrelated to  any possibility of an  insanity plea. It is also  unrelated to  the ability of the defendant to represent himself, or to any evaluation of mitigation factors.  The definition of adjudicative competence was provided by the United States Supreme Court in Dusky v. United States. 

An empirical basis for the clinical assessment of competence has not yet been established.

See also
Competence (law)

Footnotes

External links
Adjudicative Competence: The MacArthur Studies
    Standards for Determination of Competence
The MacArthur Juvenile Adjudicative Competence Study
Evaluating Juveniles' Adjudicative Competence: A Guide for Clinical Practice

Mental health law
Forensic psychology